Tirpate is a pesticide and nematocide. As of 1998, the United States Environmental Protection Agency listed the substance as discontinued in manufacturing. It is classified as an extremely hazardous substance in the United States as defined in Section 302 of the U.S. Emergency Planning and Community Right-to-Know Act (42 U.S.C. 11002), and is subject to strict reporting requirements by facilities which produce, store, or use it in significant quantities.

Tirpate can also be used as a radiolabel in plant cultures.

References

Datasheet at Cameo Chemicals

External links

Pesticides
Dithiolanes
Oxime carbamates
Carbamates
Nematicides